The 1995–96 season was the 95th season in Athletic Bilbao's history and their 65th consecutive season in La Liga, the top division of Spanish football.

Season summary

For the second season running, Athletic had to find a new head coach, having dismissed Javier Irureta in March 1995. José María Amorrortu, normally in charge of Athletic Bilbao B, stepped up until the end of the season, but in July Dragoslav Stepanović was appointed as a permanent replacement. The Yugoslavian was previously the coach of Bayer Leverkusen in Germany.

Stepanović's reign began well, with a 4–0 victory over Racing Santander at San Mamés on the opening day of their La Liga campaign. However, in January Athletic were eliminated in the last sixteen of the Copa del Rey by Real Zaragoza, and by mid April were 15th in the league, having won just eight of their first 31 games. Following a 1–0 home defeat by Valencia on 17 March, and with the team only four points clear of the relegation playoff zone, Bilbao decided to replace Stepanović with immediate effect.

Almost exactly a year after first doing so, Amorrortu stepped into the breach until the end of the season. He wasn't able to drastically improve Athletic's fortunes, although they did win three more matches before the end of the season, and finish clear of relegation danger in 15th place. Frenchman Luis Fernández, previously of Paris Saint-Germain, was appointed as the new permanent head coach at the end of the season.

Squad statistics

Appearances and goals

|}
1. Lakabeg was transferred to Celta Vigo during the season.

Results

La Liga

League table

See also
1995–96 La Liga
1995–96 Copa del Rey

External links

References

Athletic Bilbao
Athletic Bilbao seasons